The Awakening is a 1917 American silent drama film directed by George Archainbaud and starring Montagu Love, Dorothy Kelly and John Davidson. Prints and/or fragments were found in the Dawson Film Find in 1978.

Cast
 Montagu Love as Jacques Revilly 
 Dorothy Kelly as Marguerite 
 John Davidson as Horace Chapron 
 Frank Beamish as Varny 
 Joseph Granby as Prosper Chavassier 
 Josephine Earle as Celestine

References

Bibliography
 James Robert Parish & Michael R. Pitts. Film directors: a guide to their American films. Scarecrow Press, 1974.

External links
 

1917 films
1917 drama films
1910s English-language films
American silent feature films
Silent American drama films
Films directed by George Archainbaud
American black-and-white films
World Film Company films
Films shot in Fort Lee, New Jersey
1910s American films